The Princess of Wales's Royal Regiment (or PWRR, also known as 'The Tigers') is the senior English line infantry regiment of the British Army, second in the line infantry order of precedence to the Royal Regiment of Scotland and part of the Queen's Division.

History
The Princess of Wales's Royal Regiment was formed on 9 September 1992 by the amalgamation of the Queen's Regiment and the Royal Hampshire Regiment and holds the earliest battle honour in the British Army (Tangier 1662–80). Through its ancestry via the Queen's Royal Regiment (West Surrey) (2nd Regiment of Foot), the PWRR is the most senior English line infantry regiment. The current regiment was named in honour of Diana, Princess of Wales.

Upon its creation, the Princess of Wales and the Queen of Denmark were Allied Colonels-in-Chief of the PWRR. When the Princess divorced the Prince of Wales, she resigned as Colonel-in-chief and the Queen of Denmark has remained its Colonel-in-Chief since.

The 1st Battalion served a seven-month tour of Iraq in 2004 with a second tour following in 2006, and finally a tour in 2009 where the battalion was split between Afghanistan and Iraq (last combat operation in Iraq).  Many of the operations carried out by the battalion during the first tour were named after stations on the London Underground. Elements of 1 PWRR helped train the Iraqi National Army and oversaw the withdrawal of UK Forces from Basra. 1st Battalion was deployed to Afghanistan again in August 2011 to form the nucleus of the Police Mentoring Advisory Group (PMAG) with individual companies detached to other battlegroups around Helmand province. The 1st Battalion under Army 2020 will move from Paderborn, Germany to be stationed at Bulford Camp.

The regiment's 2nd Battalion were based in Shackleton Barracks, Northern Ireland, the last resident battalion deployed in this role under Operation Banner. After two years at Alexander Barracks in Dhekelia in Cyprus, they moved to Woolwich Garrison, London, to take up a public duties role in August 2010, a role they performed for three years. 2nd Battalion deployed to Cyprus again in 2014. It remains one of the infantry units rotating between the UK and British Forces Cyprus. In August 2017, the battalion returned to the UK, based at Kendrew Barracks in Cottesmore, where they reconfigured two companies into a Light Mechanised Infantry force.

The regiment's 2nd battalion re-subordinated to the Ranger Regiment on 1 December 2021.

Recruitment
The regiment recruits its soldiers from London, Kent, Surrey, Sussex, Hampshire, the Isle of Wight, and the Channel Islands.

Structure
The regimental headquarters (RHQ) is at the Tower of London, whilst the regiment itself comprises three battalions:
 1st Battalion — Light Infantry based in Woolwich, London on a two-year rotation
 3rd Battalion — Army Reserve Light Infantry serving with 20th Armoured Brigade, paired with 1st Battalion Royal Anglian Regiment
 4th Battalion — Army Reserve serving with 7th Light Mechanised Brigade Combat Team, paired with 1st Battalion Princess of Wales's Royal Regiment when in UK

Regimental museum
The Queen's & Princess of Wales's Royal Regiment Regimental Museum is in Dover Castle.

Victoria Cross and other decorations
Medals and awards awarded to the regiment's 1st Battalion for their service during operations in Iraq in 2004 included a Victoria Cross, two Distinguished Service Orders, two Conspicuous Gallantry Crosses, one Member of the Order of the British Empire for gallantry, ten Military Crosses, and seventeen Mentions in Despatches.

Private Johnson Beharry of the 1st Battalion, PWRR was awarded the Victoria Cross for his actions during his unit's deployment to Amarah, near Basra.

Whilst attached to the 1st Battalion, Michelle Norris of the Royal Army Medical Corps became the first woman to be awarded the Military Cross following her actions on 11 June 2006.

Battle honours

The forebear Regiments of the Princess of Wales's Royal Regiment were awarded over 550 Battle Honours including "Tangier 1662-80", the oldest on any Colour, the following are emblazoned on the colours:
 Queen's Colour:  Mons, Retreat from Mons, Aisne 1914, Ypres 1914 '15 '17 '18, Hill 60, Festubert 1915, Somme 1916 '18, Albert 1916 '18, Arras 1917 '18, Cambrai 1917 '18, Hindenburg Line, Italy 1917–18, Doiran 1917–18, Landing at Helles, Gaza, Jerusalem, Palestine 1917–18, Kut al Amara 1915 '17, Mesopotamia 1915–18, North West Frontier India 1915 1916–17, Dunkirk 1940, Normandy Landing, Caen, Rhine, North-West Europe 1944-45, Abyssinia 1941, El Alamein, Tebourba Gap, Hunt's Gap, Longstop Hill, North Africa 1940–43, Sicily 1943, Salerno, Anzio, Cassino, Gothic Line, Italy 1943–45, Malta 1940–42, Malaya 1941–42, Hong Kong, Defence of Kohima, Burma 1943–45

 Regimental Colour: Tangier 1662–80, Namur 1695, Gibraltar 1704–5, Blenheim, Ramillies, Oudenarde, Malplaquet, Dettingen, Minden, Louisburg, Guadeloupe 1759, Quebec 1759, Belleisle, Tournay, Barrosa, Martinique 1762, Seringapatam, Maida, Corunna, Talavera, Albuhera, Almaraz, Vittoria, Peninsula, Punniar, Moodkee, Sobraon, Inkerman, Sevastopol, Lucknow, Taku Forts, Pekin 1860, New Zealand, Afghanistan 1879–80, Nile 1884–85, Burma 1885–87, Relief of Ladysmith, Paardeberg, South Africa 1899–1902, Korea 1950-51

The Regimental Colour is particularly distinctive. The Colour is yellow and there is a unique combination of five badges displayed; the cap badge, the Naval Crown, the Tiger, the Sphinx and the cypher of Catherine of Braganza all linked to Regimental history:

 The Naval Crown superscribed "1st June 1794" – from the Queen's Royal Regiment (West Surrey)
 The Sphinx superscribed "Egypt 1801" – from the Queen's Royal Regiment (West Surrey) & Queen's Own Royal West Kent Regiment
 The cypher of Queen Catherine "1661", (wife of Charles II), intertwined/reversed letter "C" at the base of the laurel wreath from The Queen's Royal Regiment (West Surrey), in memory of the raising of the Regiment in 1661 when sent to garrison Tangier, part of Catherine of Braganza's dowry
 The Royal Tiger superscribed "India" – from the Royal Hampshire Regiment

Order of precedence

Lineage

Alliances
  - The Queen's York Rangers (1st American Regiment)
  - The South Alberta Light Horse
  - 49th (Sault Ste Marie) Field Regiment, Royal Canadian Artillery
  - The Queen's Own Rifles of Canada
  - The Hastings and Prince Edward Regiment
  - 1st Battalion, Royal New Brunswick Regiment (Carleton and York)
  - The Essex and Kent Scottish Regiment
  - The Royal New South Wales Regiment
  - The Royal Western Australia Regiment
  - University of New South Wales Regiment
  - Hauraki Regiment
  - Waikato Mounted Rifles
  - 12th, 14th, 15th, and 17th Battalions, The Punjab Regiment
  - HMS Excellent
  - 40 Commando Royal Marines - Bond of friendship
  - Le 35e Régiment d'Infanterie - Bond of Friendship
  - Den Kongelige Livgarde - Bond of Friendship

Footnotes

Notes

Citations

Further reading

 (see Chapter 13 The Tigers In Northern Ireland)

External links

Official site
 British Army Locations from 1945 British Army Locations from 1945
 Princess of Wales Royal Regiment Museum - museum information
 6/7 PWRR Regimental Association
 Victoria Crosses

 
Infantry regiments of the British Army
Military units and formations established in 1992
Military units and formations in Kent
Military units and formations of the United Kingdom in the War in Afghanistan (2001–2021)
Diana, Princess of Wales
1992 establishments in the United Kingdom